Mirosław Obłoński (born 17 July 1938 in Warsaw) ("Miki") is a Polish writer, poet, singer, and artist associated with the Piwnica pod Baranami cabaret.

He graduated from the Jagiellonian University in Kraków with a degree in history. In the early 1960s he performed with the "Piwnica Pod Baranami" ("The basement under the Rams") group and in 1964 at the Opole music festival received the top award. In 1965 he received the award again, together with Ewa Sadowska. During this time he often performed with Ewa Demarczyk. Since 1973, he worked for TV Kraków.

While he retired in 2003, he continues to occasionally perform with the new version of the "Piwnica" cabaret.

References

1938 births
Living people
Musicians from Warsaw
Jagiellonian University alumni
Polish male writers
Polish poets
20th-century Polish  male singers